Praekarn (Pier) Nirandara (born January 28, 1994), better known by the pen name Pieretta Dawn, is the youngest English-writing author in Thailand. She received national critical acclaim when her debut young adult novel The Mermaid Apprentices, the first of The Interspecies Trilogy, was published at age 15 in 2009 by NanmeeBooks. Various writers have praised her work for its creativity and social message, including S.E.A. Write Award winners Jiranan Pitpreecha and Binlah Sonkalagiri.

Biography

Dawn was born in Bangkok, Thailand. She attended Bangkok Patana School, during which she published her first novel, The Mermaid Apprentices. The book was originally written in English, and Sumalee, translator of the Harry Potter series, provided translation for the Thai version. The novel topped Thai bestseller lists, and was picked up for publication in Italian by Fazi Editore. She has cited her experience growing up in a multicultural environment and traveling to over 70 countries for inspiring her to “write a children’s fantasy series that tackles themes of identity, prejudice, morality, and social responsibility.”

Dawn has spoken at UNESCO symposiums, book events, and toured schools to promote reading and writing among Thai students. She has also appeared on radio and television interviews such as the popular VIP talk show, Dek Dee Ded, School Bus, and newspapers including Bangkok Post, The Nation (Thailand), and has been selected to be one of six Brand Ambassadors for the Bangkok Metropolitan's campaign "Bangkok Read for Life" in association with UNESCO. She was also awarded the Outstanding Youth Award by the Office of the Educational Council, officially selected by the Bangkok Metropolitan Administration as a delegate to attend the One Young World conference in Dublin, and added to Thailand's Writer's Hall of Fame. In 2014, her short story Fah was shortlisted for the S.E.A. Write Award's ASEAN Young Writers Award.

Most recently, Dawn judged the Neilson Hays Young Writers Award, and in 2017 released The Elven Ambassador, the final installment to The Interspecies Trilogy. Dawn has stated that she currently resides in Los Angeles, California, where she works in Hollywood's film industry, and runs the travel blog Pier's Great Perhaps.

Bibliography

The Interspecies Trilogy

Dawn's debut trilogy, available in multiple languages. All three books in the series have reached #1 on Thailand's National Bestseller List.

 1. The Mermaid Apprentices (2009)
 2. The Nymph Treasury (2011)
 3. The Elven Ambassador (2017)

The Interspecies Trilogy Graphic Novel Adaptations

Adapted by Dawn and with artwork by Nonworld, graphic novel adaptations are published by Nanmeebooks in English and Thai. Limited editions have also been available at 7-Eleven stores in Thailand.

 1. The Mermaid Apprentices: The Graphic Novel (2012)
 2. The Nymph Treasury: The Graphic Novel Part 1 (2013)
 3. The Nymph Treasury: The Graphic Novel Part 2 (2014)
 4. The Elven Ambassador: The Graphic Novel Part 1 (TBD)
 5. The Elven Ambassador: The Graphic Novel Part 2 (TBD)

Lani and The White Witch

In 2012, Dawn wrote a short story titled Lani and The White Witch, along with a graphic novel adaptation. The story is a tie-in with the Kasikornbank and Ogilvy & Mather's television commercial, and was released for free in English and Thai on the Kasikornbank's Facebook page. Two other authors also wrote stories for the commercial project, including Thailand's ex-Prime Minister Abhisit Vejjajiva's sister, S.E.A. Write Award winner Ngarmpun Vejjajiva.

Fah

In 2014, Dawn was shortlisted for the S.E.A. Write Award's ASEAN Young Writers Award with her short story Fah. She has stated on her website that the story "chronicles the journey of a Thai prostitute named “Fah” (ฟ้า) which simultaneously means “blue” and “sky” in Thai."

References

External links

Official website

Pieretta Dawn
Pieretta Dawn
1994 births
Living people
Pieretta Dawn
Pieretta Dawn
Women writers of young adult literature
Pieretta Dawn
21st-century novelists
Pieretta Dawn
Pseudonymous women writers
21st-century pseudonymous writers